Syzygium pondoense is a species of plants in the family Myrtaceae. It is endemic to South Africa.  It is threatened by habitat loss.

Gallery

References

van Wyk, B. and van Wyk, P. 1997. Field Guide to trees of South Africa. Struik, Cape Town

pondoense
Endemic flora of South Africa
Vulnerable flora of Africa
Taxonomy articles created by Polbot